Alizai may refer to:

Alizai, Kurram, a village in Kurram Agency, Federally Administered Tribal Areas of Pakistan
Alizai (Pashtun tribe), a Pashtun tribe in Afghanistan and Pakistan

People with the surname
Ahmadullah Alizai (born 1972), Afghan politician